Tommaso Farabegoli (born 26 March 1999) is an Italian football who plays as a defender for Serie D club Campodarsego.

Club career

Cesena
He was raised in the youth teams of Cesena and started playing for their Under-19 squad in the 2016–17 season.

In the first half of the 2017–18 Serie B season he was called up to the senior squad many times, but didn't make any appearances.

Loan to Sassuolo
On 14 January 2018 he joined Sassuolo on loan until the end of the season. There he played for the Under-19 squad.

Sampdoria
Following Cesena's bankruptcy in the summer of 2018, he became a free agent and joined Serie A club Sampdoria. He spent most of the following 2018–19 season in the Under-19 squad again. He was called up for the senior squad for the first time on 5 May 2019 for a game against Parma, but stayed on the bench.

Loans to Serie C
On 16 July 2019 he was loaned to Serie C club Vis Pesaro.

He made his professional Serie C debut for Vis Pesaro on 25 August 2019 in a game against Südtirol. He started the game and played the whole match. He established himself as regular starter early in the season.

On 28 August 2020 the loan has been extended.

On 8 January 2021 he moved on a new loan to Feralpisalò.

On 13 August 2021 he was loaned to Ancona-Matelica. On 27 January 2022, he returned to Feralpisalò on a new loan.

Serie C
On 28 July 2022, Farabegoli signed a two-year contract with Sangiuliano, newly promoted to Serie C. On 14 December 2022, his contract with Sangiuliano was terminated by mutual consent.

Serie D
On 15 December 2022, Farabegoli joined Serie D club Campodarsego.

References

External links
 

1999 births
Living people
People from Cesena
Footballers from Emilia-Romagna
Sportspeople from the Province of Forlì-Cesena
Italian footballers
Association football defenders
Serie C players
A.C. Cesena players
U.S. Sassuolo Calcio players
U.C. Sampdoria players
Vis Pesaro dal 1898 players
FeralpiSalò players
Ancona-Matelica players
F.C. Sangiuliano City players
A.C.D. Campodarsego players